Alicia Sheridan Le Fanu (1753–1817) was an Irish writer. She was the daughter of actor Thomas Sheridan and his wife, writer Frances Chamberlaine Sheridan. She was the sister of Richard Brinsley Sheridan and Betsy Sheridan and the aunt of writer Alicia LeFanu (with whom she is sometimes confused).

Select bibliography
 The Sons of Erin; Or, Modern Sentiment

References

1753 births
1817 deaths
18th-century Irish dramatists and playwrights
18th-century Irish women writers
19th-century Irish dramatists and playwrights
19th-century Irish women writers
Irish women dramatists and playwrights
Alicia Sheridan
Writers from Dublin (city)